Masha and the Bear is a Russian preschool comedy computer-animated television series created by Oleg Kuzovkov and produced by Animaccord Animation Studio, loosely based on the oral children's folk story of the same name. The show focuses on the adventures of a little girl named Masha and her caring friend, the bear (miška) that always keeps her safe from disasters.

Masha and The Bear is the most watched preschool series in the world, with 36 times more requests than the average.  It is also the fifth most-watched youth series (0–18) worldwide, just ahead of Peppa Pig. 

Many of the episodes have been successful on YouTube. In particular, the Russian-language version of the episode "Маша плюс каша" ("Maša plûs kaša" or "Recipe for Disaster") has almost 4.5 billion views as of April 2022, making it the site's twelfth most viewed video of all time, and the most viewed video on YouTube that is not a music video.

The show consists of six seasons. Season 5, launched in June 2020 was the first Russian-produced animated TV show to be released in 4K.

Plot
Masha is a four-year-old girl who lives in the forest with her pig, goat, and dog. In the first episode, it is shown that all the animals in the forest are afraid of her, as she is constantly forcing them to play with her. Then Masha sees a butterfly and inadvertently follows it inside the home of the Bear, who has gone fishing. While playing there, she makes a big mess. When he returns, he sees the disaster caused by Masha. The Bear tries to get rid of Masha but after multiple failed attempts, the unlikely duo become friends.

In each episode of the show, Masha is portrayed as a bright but mischievous little girl who loves exploring the world around her. Masha's shenanigans result in unexpected but entertaining situations that are at the heart of the show's episodes. The kind-hearted Bear is always trying to keep Masha out of trouble, but often ends up the unintended victim of her mischief. There are several supporting characters in the series, including Masha's cousin Dasha, a penguin adopted by the Bear, a young panda cub from China (the Bear's cousin), two wolves who live in an old UAZ ambulance car, a tiger that used to work with the Bear in the circus, and a Female Bear that is the object of the Bear's affections. Characters also include a hare, squirrels and hedgehogs, a pig called Rosie, a goat, and a dog who all live in Masha's front yard.

Characters

Main
Masha

Masha (a diminutive form of Maria) is a 4-year-old girl who is portrayed as naughty and hyperactive, and always thinks about playing. She lives in a house near a railway station; near her house there is a path that leads to the Bear's house. Masha loves the bear very much, but in her games she tends to create problems for him. In the series, neither Masha's parents nor the parents of her friends are shown. She loves sweets, jumping in a bucket, and looking at drawings of her and Bear. Masha's character combines the characteristics of 4-year-old (making grammatical errors when speaking, crying when she is not given what she wants) with adult skills (playing tennis, fishing, making preserves, playing electric guitar and throwing tantrums). In the episode "God Save the Queen", it is revealed that Masha has super strength, as she managed to pull a multi-ton train near her house just to give an elegant reception for the Lion King. She is voiced by Alina Kukushkina in Russian, and in English by Elsie Fisher. In subsequent seasons, Masha was dubbed by Rebecca Bloom (ep. 27–39) and Angelica Keamy (ep. 40–52) and now dubbed by Kaitlyn McCormick. She is usually shown wearing a white shirt under a purple dress with a purple hood covering her short hair.

Bear
The bear is a retired circus Kamchatka brown bear who lives in a house hollowed out of a tree in the forest. His past occupation makes him very talented in performing arts (like juggling, unicycling, and even stage magic) although he's also known to dabble into other hobbies and even some intellectual pursuits. Some episodes feature flashbacks in which he remembers his childhood as a cub in the same house. In the Russian-language version, Masha calls him "Mishka" (Russian: Мишка, a diminutive form of Russian name Misha, lit. "Mikey", fig. "Little Bear"), the traditional name given to bears in Russian tales. He is a huge bear with a big heart and he is Masha's father-like figure, as well as a friendly figure to her. He was voiced by Boris Kutnevich & Irina Kukushkina. He earlier also resided in Moscow.

Masha's Pets
A terrier, a goat, and a pig (and in the episode "How They Met", three chickens) who live outside Masha's house in her front yard, but almost every time Masha comes out, they hide themselves to avoid her. The Pig is often forced to play with Masha, who makes it dress up like a baby in a stroller. In the episode "Dance Fever" it is revealed that the pig's name is Rosie.

The Wild Animals
The wild animals are a hare, red squirrels, hedgehogs, and two wolves. Masha and a certain Hare—in “One, two three! Light the Christmas Tree”, Father Frost’s list calls him ‘Bunny’, and in “Surprise! Surprise!” he delivers painted eggs—often play hockey together (and make a mess or accidentally hurt someone). The Hare is occasionally an antagonist of the Bear, due to stealing carrots from the Bear's garden. The two Wolves live in a derelict ambulance car on top of a hill, often looking for something to eat, and act as medics for any apparent injuries or illnesses, though they sometimes fear Masha (living in an ambulance cab and acting as medics is a pun on the Russian idiomatic expression Волки — санитары леса, "wolves are orderlies of the woods").

She-Bear
The She-Bear is a female grizzly bear. The Bear is enamored of her and sometimes goes out of his way to impress her. The first time she rebuffed him in favor of the Black Bear, only to realize how self-absorbed he is. Another time, she turned her nose up at the Bear's classical guitar playing as she preferred more modern music. Even so, the She-Bear usually opens up to the Bear, such as the time she agreed to have a dinner with him, and she is sometimes kind to Masha, such as giving her a fashion magazine, helping to train her for her tennis match against the Black Bear, and helping her learn to ice-skate.

Dasha
Dasha is Masha's cousin from Moscow, who looks like Masha, but is more "ladylike", has platinum-blonde hair and blue eyes (Masha's are green), wears boxy blue-rimmed glasses and an orange dress. She is afraid of the Bear and calls him "Shaggy", "Monster" and "Beast". She is voiced by Alina Kukushkina.

Panda
Panda is a panda cub and the Bear's young cousin from China. He and Masha are rivals, often bickering every time he comes for a visit, but they occasionally get along and have fun together.

Recurring
Whiskers n' Stripes
A Siberian tiger who is Bear's best friend from their days performing together in the Moscow circus.

The Black Bear
A Himalayan black bear, who is Bear's worst enemy and Bear's chief rival for the attentions of the She-Bear. The Black Bear has an arrogant and unsportsmanlike personality, cheating to win against Masha in a tennis game, and laughing at her when she grows gigantic. Bear's biggest fear is if Black Bear and She-Bear marry, which is shown in Game Over when Bear imagines what will happen if he plays games his whole life.

Penguin
An Adélie penguin that first appears in "The Foundling", as an egg that Masha finds and makes the Bear hatch. The Penguin quickly imprints on the Bear as his parental-figure and the Bear forms a sincere bond with him, but chooses to send the Penguin to live in Antarctica for his own health. Even so, they stay in touch and the Penguin once visited.

Ded Moroz (fig. Grandfather Frost)
A Russian version of Santa Claus (from Russian fairy tales) who appears in Christmas-themed episodes.

Four-eyed aliens
A trio of alien specimens who accidentally crashed on Earth, they were helped by Bear and Masha to get back to their spaceship.

Twelve Months

Sources
According to the project's director, Denis Chervyatsov,

Production

The series' production has been handled domestically at Animaccord Animation Studio since 2008. The scenario for each episode is written by Oleg Kuzovkov, creator of the cartoon. Then the storyboarding is developed in accordance with the script and, in general, consists of at least 2000 slides. After the team finalizes the plot of an episode, the work for the 2D animatic kicks off. At this stage, animators define the duration of each scene in an episode, how characters are placed in it and interact with each other. After this step of the production is finished, the episode is passed for dubbing. Dubbing must be completed before 3D animation is applied, as the 3D animators need to know the characters' dialogue, intonations, and emotions in advance in order to keep their lip movements synchronized to the audio and make their facial expressions look realistic.

3D animation
The 3D animation process begins right after dubbing has been finished. Animators manipulate all the movements that happen during the scenes, such as opening doors, taking books from bookshelves, and creating all the bodily movements required to bring the characters to life.

Rendering Manager
Rendering Manager brings all the processes together. Renderers colorize grey 3D models and add such details as the Bear's fur, Masha's hair, etc. They create the lighting and weather in the scene as determined by the script.

Compositing
Compositing is the final stage of production, where the compositors review all shots of an episode, checking the color intensities, smoothing the edges of 3D models, adding 2D/3D effects and bringing all the components together to form a complete episode. Then the work is approved by the director and script-writer and uploaded to the show's official YouTube channel 'Masha and the Bear - Official Channel' formerly 'MashaBearTV' before it can be shown on TV.

Actors
Masha, her cousin Dasha, and Father Frost are the only characters who speak. The others communicate through pantomime or wordless sounds.

For the first two seasons, Masha's voice in the original Russian version was performed by Alina Kukushkina, who was 6 years old when she began to dub Masha. For the third season (seven years later in 2015), the officials of Animaccord studio confirmed that the new voice of Masha would be 6-year-old Barbara Sarantseva and then replaced again by Yulia Zunikova in 2020. The show's sound designer, Boris Kutnevich, provides the voice of The Bear. Mark Kutnevich provides the voice of The Hare.

For the English version, Elsie Fisher – the voice of Agnes in the Despicable Me films – dubbed the voice of Masha in the first season. In subsequent seasons Masha was dubbed by Rebecca Bloom (ep. 27–39) and Angelica Keamy (ep. 40–52) and now is Kaitlyn McCormick.

For Indonesian version, Azelia Rashika Andini was Masha's voice.

Soundtrack
The soundtrack for each episode is written by Russian composer Vasily Bogatyrev . Many compositions are stylized for famous works: Moonlight Sonata, Beethoven's Symphony No. 5, a circus theme from the movie Soviet Circus, and in the episode “One-Hit Wonder” the rockstar Masha performs a song in the style of the group AC/DC. Most of the songs used in the cartoon, such as the soundtracks of “Laundry Day” and “The Grand Piano Lesson” episodes, became popular in Russia and abroad.

Awards and achievements

In January 2015, the cartoon was included into a list of "TV Shows Destined to be Classics," which was compiled by the cartoon industry's periodical Animation Magazine to mark its 250 issue.
In February 2015, Masha and the Bear won a 2015 Kidscreen Award for Best Animation in the Creative Talent.
In October 2015, Kidscreen Magazine named Animaccord Animation Studios as one of the top 50 leaders in the world of animation (Kidscreen Hot50) and the top 10 production companies of the year.
In 2018, the cartoon was included in the Guinness World Records as the most-watched animated video on YouTube, with the episode “Recipe for Disaster” that today counts over 4.4 billion views. The episode was included in the most viewed video of all time, together with such well-known artists as Ed Sheeran with “Shape of you” video and Luis Fonsi ft. Daddy Yankee with “Despacito”.

According to the Associated Press, "Masha, who is dressed in a folk costume with a headscarf, became a household name in many Muslim nations including Indonesia." Dmitry Loveyko, managing director of Animaccord, said that "It's a Muslim country, so we thought we're lucky she wears a headscarf and her legs are covered!"

Mobile apps
The first Masha and the Bear mobile app was released by Apps Ministry in August 2011. In 2013 the first mobile game Masha and the Bear: Search and Rescue was published by Apps Ministry. Later more publishers such as Indigo Kids, PSV Studio, Noviy Disk developed and released games and apps featuring Masha and the Bear.

Distribution

Netflix has released 27 of the first 29 episodes in 9 episodes of 3 segments each. Many of the videos were uploaded multiple times on three different YouTube channels ("Маша и Медведь", "Get Movies" and "Masha and The Bear") so their view counts across up to three channels have been combined.

Episodes

Broadcast

As of 2019, Masha and the Bear premieres on CTC in Russia, HOP! in Israel, and Treehouse TV in Canada. In the Middle East and North Africa, it premieres on Boomerang, as well as Spacetoon. It premiered on Junior in Germany and it aired on Boomerang, Cartoon Network Too, Cartoonito and Tiny Pop in the United Kingdom. It also premiered on Malyatko TV in Ukraine, and it premiered on Mega-Mult and Tlum in Russia on August 1, 2019. It is broadcast in Indonesia by ANTV and VTV, and it is also broadcast on various channels in Pakistan. In India, it is broadcast on Nick Jr. In the Philippines, it was broadcast on Yey! every 7:30 am in the Bibolilits block and was aired in the Kidz Weekend Block of A2Z Channel 11 and was also streaming on iWantTFC.

After December 31, 2022, Masha and the Bear left Universal Kids after  years, and it was replaced by Polly Pocket. This is possibly due to the ongoing 2022 Russian invasion of Ukraine.

Spin-offs

Masha's Tales
A spin-off series to the show titled Masha's Tales is also available on Netflix. In the show Masha (voiced by a much older actress) tells classic Russian fairy tales as well as some Grimms' Fairy Tales to her toys. However, Masha makes up her own way of telling the stories (Such as putting a magical nutcracker who turns into a prince when she adapts Cinderella). She also mixes up the morals of the stories by often adding an additional ending so that way it could fit with what she's telling her toys. Masha's Tales premiered on Cartoon Network UK's sister pre-school channel, Cartoonito on June 20, 2016.

Debut dates listed per Treehouse TV:

Masha's Spooky Stories
Another spin-off of the Masha and the Bear franchise, Masha's Spooky Stories, premiered on Cartoonito UK and Netflix in October 2016.

Debuts dates listed are for English releases in Canada on Treehouse TV, original air dates in Russia unknown:

See also
 List of most-viewed YouTube videos

References

External links 
 Masha and the Bear at IMDb.

2000s animated comedy television series
2000s children's television series
2000s Russian television series
2009 Russian television series debuts
2010s animated comedy television series
2010s children's television series
2010s Russian television series
Animated television series about bears
Animated television series about children
Carousel (TV channel) original programming
Fictional duos
Fictional bears
Russia-1 original programming
Russian children's animated adventure television series
Russian children's animated comedy television series
Russian computer-animated television series
Boomerang (TV network) original programming
Cartoonito original programming
Treehouse TV original programming
Russian-language television shows
English-language television shows